The 2019 New Zealand Music Awards was the 54th holding of the annual ceremony featuring awards for musical recording artists based in or originating from New Zealand. It took place on 14 November 2019 at Spark Arena in Auckland and was hosted by Laura Daniel and Jon Toogood. The awards show was broadcast live nationally on Three.

References

External links
Official New Zealand Music Awards website

New Zealand Music Awards, 2019
Music Awards, 2019
Aotearoa Music Awards
November 2019 events in New Zealand
New Zealand awards